Innogy Sporthalle (formerly known as RWE Rhein-Ruhr Sporthalle or RWE-Sporthalle), is an indoor sports arena in Mülheim an der Ruhr, Germany. The arena is commonly used for badminton, boxing, and handball competitions. Its current name is part of partnership with German energy company Innogy, a subsidiary of RWE.

History
The first foundation stone was laid on 3 July 2003 and the construction time took 19 months. During the first month of opening, it hosted city-level indoor football championships, followed by German Open badminton championships. It also hosted some events of 2005 World Games.

References

Indoor arenas in Germany
Sport in Mülheim
Buildings and structures in Mülheim
Badminton venues
Sports venues in North Rhine-Westphalia